WBIV-LP was a low-power television station in St. Thomas, U.S. Virgin Islands transmitting over analog channel 38. The station was owned by Virgin Islands Telecommunications Ventures, LLC.

The station was founded in 1992, and its transmitter covered the entire island of St. Thomas and parts of St. John.

The station's license was canceled by the Federal Communications Commission (FCC) on October 1, 2012.

External links

FCCinfo.com
TVRadioWorld.com

BIV-LP
Defunct television stations in the United States
Television channels and stations established in 1992
Television channels and stations disestablished in 2012
1992 establishments in the United States Virgin Islands
2012 disestablishments in the United States Virgin Islands
BIV-LP